This is an incomplete list of hurlers who have played at senior level for the Kilkenny county team.



A

B

C

D

F

G

H

J

K

L

M

N

O

P

R

S

T

W

Hurlers

Kilkenny